A Disintegrin and metalloproteinase domain-containing protein 8 is an enzyme that in humans is encoded by the ADAM8 gene.

Function 

This gene encodes a member of the ADAM (a disintegrin and metalloproteinase domain) family. Members of this family are membrane-anchored proteins structurally related to snake venom disintegrins, and have been implicated in a variety of biological processes involving cell–cell and cell-matrix interactions, including fertilization, muscle development, and neurogenesis. The protein encoded by this gene may be involved in cell adhesion during neurodegeneration.

See also 
 Cluster of differentiation

References

Further reading

External links 
 The MEROPS online database for peptidases and their inhibitors: M12.208
 
 
 PDBe-KB provides an overview of all the structure information available in the PDB for Human Disintegrin and metalloproteinase domain-containing protein 8 (ADAM8)

Clusters of differentiation
Proteases
EC 3.4.24